The Theba are a Muslim community found in the state of Gujarat in India and the province of Sindh in Pakistan. They are one of a number of communities of pastoral nomads found in the Banni region of Kutch.  The community is also known as Thebo, especially in Sindh.

History and origin

The Theba are a branch of the Sameja tribe, and their historic homeland is the Tharparkar District of Sindh.  They get their name from Thebu Sameja, their ancestor, who migrated to Kutch about six hundred years ago. Their initial settlement was Jadura village in Bhuj taluka. From Jadura, they migrated to other parts of Kutch. They are now found throughout the Bhuj taluka. The Theba speak Kutchi, which many Sindhi loanwords.
Theba families now located at Gujarat State, Mumbai City, South Africa, United Kingdom, Turkey and Pakistan

Present circumstances

The community is divided into two lineages, both of equal status. They are an endogamous community, but do marry with other Samma communities, such as the Sameja. They do not practice clan exogamy as rule, but each clan is of equal status, and do intermarry. The community in fact prefers parallel cousin marriages.

The Theba are a community of Maldhari cattle breeders. In addition to cattle breeding, the Theba are also cultivators, and landless agricultural labourers. Many are employed in the stone quarries that exist in Bhuj taluks. Like other Kutchi communities, many of them have migrated to other parts of India in search of employment. They are Sunni Muslims  and most follow the Barelvi tradition.

See also

 Sameja
 Samma
 Sindhi Rajputs

References

Social groups of Pakistan
Muslim communities of India
Sindhi tribes

Sindhi tribes in India
Muslim communities of Gujarat
Social groups of Gujarat
Tribes of Kutch
Maldhari communities